The Old Man is a 1978 historical novel by Yury Trifonov. The novel details the investigations of Pavel, a retired revolutionary, into the killing of a Cossack officer in his youth against the background of his purchase of a retirement dacha.

References

1978 novels
Novels by Yury Trifonov